Hynobius arisanensis, the Alishan salamander, is a species of salamander in the family Hynobiidae endemic to Taiwan. Its natural habitats are temperate forests, rivers, and freshwater springs. It is usually hiding during day time.

Adult H. arisanensis measure  in snout–vent length. It is blackish-brown to reddish-brown dorsally and somewhat lighter brown or grey-brown ventrally.

Distribution and habitat
A study of H. arisanensis in the Alishan Range found the adults had home ranges of up to 500 m2 (mean 65 m2). Adult and juvenile survival was high, 0.996 and 0.977, respectively. With the estimated population growth ratio of 1.077, the population appeared stable or slightly increasing. It probably breeds in the streams with the larvae developing in the water.

Status
In its Red List of Threatened Species, the IUCN lists Hynobius arisanensis as being "endangered". This is because it is restricted to the Alishan, Yushan and Pei Ta Wu Shan mountain ranges in Taiwan where its range is fragmented. It is present in the Yushan National Park and the Tawushan Nature Preserve which should provide some measure of protection.

Sources

arisanensis
Amphibians described in 1922
Endemic fauna of Taiwan
Amphibians of Taiwan
Taxonomy articles created by Polbot